Mathias Roman Salas is a Bougainvillian politician and Cabinet Minister.

Salas is a former banker.

In 2005 Salas was elected to the first Bougainville parliament as a member of the Bougainville People’s Congress Party. On 23 June 2005 he was appointed Minister of Finance and Minerals, Gas and Petroleum Exploration in the cabinet of President Joseph Kabui. In 2008 he served as acting vice-President. He subsequently lost his seat in the 2010 election.

Salas was re-elected to parliament in the 2020 Bougainvillean general election. On 2 October 2020 he was appointed Minister of Finance in the cabinet of Ishmael Toroama.

References

Members of the Bougainville House of Representatives
Government ministers of the Autonomous Region of Bougainville
People from the Autonomous Region of Bougainville
Living people

Year of birth missing (living people)